Round Midnight is a music compilation album under the Midnight Soul collection series.   Distributed by Time-Life through its music division, the album was released on January 1, 2008 and featured fifteen urban contemporary R&B hits which were released between the late 1990s and the early 2000s.

Track listing
Brandy - "Have You Ever?"
Ja Rule - "Always On Time"
Ashanti - "Foolish"
Brandy and Monica - "The Boy Is Mine"
Adina Howard - "Freak Like Me"
Chuckii Booker - "Games"
All-4-One - "I Swear"
Brownstone - "If You Love Me"
Carl Thomas - "I Wish"
TLC - "Waterfalls"
Tamia - "Stranger In My House"
Keith Sweat featuring Athena Cage - "Nobody"
Monica - "The First Night"
Lisa Fischer - "How Can I Ease the Pain"
Troop - "Spread My Wings"

References

2008 compilation albums